Andrew Tarver (born May 6, 1986) is an American actor and comedian from the Upright Citizens Brigade Theater in Los Angeles. He is known for starring in the Seeso show Bajillion Dollar Propertie$ and for his appearances on comedy podcasts, including Comedy Bang! Bang! and Big Grande Teachers' Lounge. He currently stars as Cary Dubek on the comedy series The Other Two.

Early life
Tarver was born in Glennville, Georgia. His graduating class had 20 people total. His family owned a local candy factory. Tarver is the oldest of four children: he has two sisters; Amanda, actress and singer Katelyn Tarver; and a younger “cooler” brother, Jake.

Tarver moved to New York City when he was 18. He worked several jobs to support himself and pay for acting classes. After taking improv classes at Upright Citizens Brigade Theater in New York, he eventually moved to Los Angeles and continued to perform at the Los Angeles UCB.

Career 
Tarver has performed comedy with the Upright Citizens Brigade Theater in Los Angeles since 2010. He is a member of the sketch and improv comedy group Big Grande (alongside comedians Jon Mackey, Ryan Rosenberg, and Dan Lippert) and plays Bill Cravy on their podcast, Big Grande Teachers' Lounge. With Big Grande, Tarver co-wrote and starred in a 22-minute original comedy pilot for Funny or Die and several episodes of The UCB Show. Tarver is also a regular guest on the podcasts Comedy Bang! Bang!, Matt Besser's podcast improv4humans, and Paul F. Tompkins' podcast Spontaneanation.

In 2014, Tarver played Todd, the gay best friend of lead Greta Gerwig on the pilot How I Met Your Dad, which was not picked up by CBS.

He was an ensemble cast member on Bajillion Dollar Propertie$, in which he portrayed the role of Baxter Reynolds. The first three seasons streamed on Seeso from 2016 to 2017. The fourth and final season aired on Pluto TV in 2019.

In 2017 Tarver played the fictional Carl Hardee Jr. in a series of commercials for Carl's Jr. and Hardee's.

Tarver was cast in the lead role of Cary Dubek in the 2019 Comedy Central series The Other Two. He described it as his first series role that is not an exaggerated comedic character as seen in his previous work in improv and sketch comedy. The show received positive critical reception and in September 2021 was renewed for a third season.

Tarver has a recurring role as a local oddball named Randy on Bless the Harts, an animated series on Fox.

In 2020, Tarver performed in the comedy-mystery Mapleworth Murders for Quibi.

Personal life
Tarver came out as bisexual at age 26.

Filmography

References

External links
 
 

Living people
21st-century American comedians
21st-century American male actors
American male film actors
American male television actors
American male comedians
American sketch comedians
Bisexual male actors
Bisexual comedians
LGBT people from Georgia (U.S. state)
Upright Citizens Brigade Theater performers
People from Glennville, Georgia
Comedians from Georgia (U.S. state)
1985 births
21st-century American LGBT people
American bisexual actors
American LGBT comedians